The 1970–71 Yugoslav First Basketball League season was the 27th season of the Yugoslav First Basketball League, the highest professional basketball league in SFR Yugoslavia.

Classification 

The winning roster of Jugoplastika:
   (born 1942, 83 points)
   (1948, 30)
  Mihajlo Manović (1948, 104)
   (1951, 4)
  Ratomir Tvrdić (1943, 392)
  Martin Guvo (1949, 3)
   (1947, 31)
   (1941, 138)
  Damir Šolman (1948, 526)
  Siniša Depolo
   (1944, 196)
  Petar Skansi (1943, 387)
  Gordan Grgin
  Momčilo Radulović (1945, 1)

Coach:  Branko Radović

Qualification in 1971-72 season European competitions 

FIBA European Champions Cup
 Jugoplastika (champions)

FIBA Cup Winner's Cup
 Crvena Zvezda (Cup winners)

FIBA Korać Cup
 Lokomotiva (2nd)
 OKK Beograd (4th)

References

Yugoslav First Basketball League seasons
Yugo
Yugo